Brasch is a German and Danish surname, a variant of Braasch. Notable people with the surname include:

 Moritz Brasch (1843–1895), Polish-German Jewish philosopher
 Charles Orwell Brasch (1909–1973), New Zealand Jewish poet, literary editor, arts patron
 Arno Brasch (1910–1963), German physician; (de)
 Rudolph Brasch (1912–2004), German-Australian rabbi, author
 Horst Brasch (1922–1989), German politician (de)
 Thomas Brasch (1945–2001), German Jewish writer, dramatist, editor, lyricist
 Walter M. Brasch (1945–2017), American Jewish journalist
 Klaus Brasch (1950–1980), German actor; (de)
 Lydia Brasch (born 1953), American politician
 Peter Brasch (1955–2001), German writer; (de)
 Paul Brasch (born 1964), Australian stand-up comedian
 Caroline Brasch Nielsen (born 1993), Danish model

See also 
 Braasch
 Brash (disambiguation)

Surnames
Danish-language surnames
German-language surnames